Challenger Airlines was a United States airline incorporated in Wyoming, December 31, 1941, by Charles W. Hirsig II, as Summit Airways Inc., a non-scheduled carrier. In 1944, Hirsig filed an application with the Civil Aeronautics Board (CAB) Docket No. 1091, for a Certificate of Public Convenience and Necessity to engage in air transportation in Wyoming, Colorado, and Nebraska.

History
Mr. Hirsig was killed in an airplane accident on January 15, 1945. After Hirsig's death, George J. Forbes, president of the 1st National Bank of Laramie WY, a director and one of the original incorporators of Summit became president. At the annual stockholders meeting January 7, 1947, the airline company's name was changed from Summit Airways Inc., to Challenger Airlines Company, and George W. Snyder Jr. was elected President and General Manager.

On January 9, 1947, the Laramie Republican and Boomerang, reported that Summit Airways [Challenger] had purchased three Douglas DC-3 planes from the Pennsylvania Airline Company. Snyder moved all operations to Salt Lake City, Utah, where a hangar was leased on the airport and the main office was located downtown in the Felt Building.

On January 27, 1947, Summit [Challenger] purchased a C-47, at Hill Air Force Base, near Ogden, Utah, from the War Assets Administration which brought Challenger's fleet to four DC-3s. (The C-47 was the military version of the Douglas DC-3). An AT-6 was also owned by the Company, which was used for pilot route familiarization, and occasionally to fly a mechanic and parts to a city where a DC-3 had a mechanical problem.

Challenger achieved full-scale operations on July 10, 1947, on all segments of Air Mail Route 74, with service between Salt Lake City, Utah, Billings, Montana, and Denver, Colorado. Intermediate stops on the routes were Vernal, Utah, Evanston, Kemmerer, Powell, Cody, Lovell, Greybull, Worland, Thermopolis, Riverton, Casper, Rock Springs, Rawlins, Laramie and Cheyenne WY, plus Ft. Collins and Greeley in CO.

The real opportunity to prove its value to the people of Wyoming came with the paralyzing blizzard in the month of February, 1949. Challenger pilots flew thousands of passengers who had been immobilized by roof-high snow drifts which blocked highways and railroads over much of the state. Tons of fresh meat, bread, produce and Red Cross supplies filled practically every scheduled and shuttle flight to its gross weight capacity as Challenger's "Sunliners" roared off snow swept airports across Wyoming.

The airline was in financial trouble most of its existence and merged with Monarch Airlines and Arizona Airways on June 1, 1950, to form Frontier Airlines, headquartered in Denver, Colorado.

See also 
 List of defunct airlines of the United States

References
Schultz, Ken "Challenger Airlines Company".  Wheat Ridge, Colorado: Self-published essay, 2001–2001.
Lamkins, Jake "Challenger Airlines website".  http://Jakeroo.tripod.com/Challenger.html

External links
Old Frontier Airlines a website about the history of the old Frontier Airlines and its predecessor airlines.

Defunct airlines of the United States
Airlines established in 1941
Companies based in Wyoming
Companies based in Salt Lake City
Defunct companies based in Utah
1941 establishments in Wyoming
1950 disestablishments in Utah
1950 mergers and acquisitions
Airlines disestablished in 1950